William Tummel (March 5, 1892 – November 16, 1977) was an American assistant director. He worked on 59 films between 1925 and 1947. He won an Academy Award in 1933 for Best Assistant Director. He was born in Kansas City, Missouri and died in Los Angeles, California.

Selected filmography
Siberia (1926)

References

External links

1892 births
1977 deaths
American film directors
Best Assistant Director Academy Award winners